The 2011 Women's NORCECA Volleyball Championship, was held from September 12 to 17, in Caguas, Puerto Rico. The winner qualified for the 2011 FIVB Women's World Cup, in Japan.

Competing nations
The following national teams have qualified:

Squads

Pool standing procedure
Match won 3–0: 5 points for the winner, 0 point for the loser
Match won 3–1: 4 points for the winner, 1 points for the loser
Match won 3–2: 3 points for the winner, 2 points for the loser
In case of tie, the teams were classified according to the following criteria:
points ratio and sets ratio

First round

Pool A

|}

Pool B

|}

Pool C

Final round

Championship

Classification 7th–9th

|}

Quarterfinals

|}

Classification 7th–8th

|}

Semifinals

|}

Classification 5th–6th

|}

Bronze medal match

Final

Final standing

Individual awards
MVP:  Bethania de la Cruz
Best Scorer:  Sarah Pavan
Best Spiker:  Yanelis Santos
Best Blocker:  Marisa Field
Best Server:  Logan Tom
Best Digger:  Brenda Castillo
Best Setter:  Lindsey Berg
Best Receiver:  Brenda Castillo
Best Libero:  Brenda Castillo
Eugenio George Laffita Award:  Hugh McCutcheon

References

External links
Official website

Women's NORCECA Volleyball Championship
NORCECA Women's Volleyball Championship
NORCECA Women's Volleyball Championship
International volleyball competitions hosted by Puerto Rico